A meat shoot is a type of shooting sport similar to block shoots, ham shoots, and turkey shoots. They are typically run as fundraising events by small rod and gun clubs, gun owners associations, or Veterans of Foreign Wars chapters. Rules vary by location, but the general idea is that using shotguns or other small target-shooting weapons, participants shoot at paper targets to try to win prizes (often hams, turkeys, or select cuts of beef).

Events usually include a numbered sign-up sheet on which shooters write their name to indicate for which prize they would like to compete. Different lines on the sheet correspond to different specific prizes (e.g., line No. 1 may be competing for a ham). Shooters can often buy as many chances to shoot as they would like.

There are target cards numbered from 1 to 20 for each shoot. All targets are paper, all shells are light target loads, and both are provided by the club to maintain fairness. Each set of twenty targets is numbered to match the number of the corresponding sign-up sheet. The targets are hung out one at a time, and each shooter fires one shot at one target, in the numerical order of the sign-up sheet. The targets are inspected and measured by a judge with a magnifying glass, who sees only the numbered targets, from one shooter at a time, in order to preserve anonymity and prevent bias. The card with a hole closest to the X in the center of the target is the winner. It is irrelevant how many pellets hit the card; the one closest to center is the one that counts.

References

Further reading
 

Shooting sports
Fundraising